Thomas Longman, (1804–1879) was the head of the London publishing house Longman, while in charge he oversaw the publication of a sumptuous art book containing images of many of the great masters. Longman also published works by the Whig historian Lord Macaulay, works by the philosopher John Stuart Mill and novels by Benjamin Disraeli who was a prominent Victorian politician who became Prime Minister,

Biography
Longman eldest son of Thomas Norton Longman, was born in 1804. He was educated at Glasgow University, and at an early age began his career in the publishing house of Longman.  In 1832 he became a partner in it, and in 1842 he succeeded his father as its head.

Apart from the ordinary business of the firm, Longman devoted much attention to the preparation of a sumptuous work, which was produced under his special superintendence, The New Testament Illustrated, with Engravings on Wood after Paintings by Fra Angelico, Pietro Perugino, Francesco Francia, Lorenzo di Credi, Fra Bartolommeo, Titian, Raphael, Gaudenzio Ferrari, Danielle da Volterra, and other great Masters, chiefly of the Early Italian Schoo. The first edition, consisting of 250 copies only, at ten guineas each, was sold on the day of publication. A second and less costly edition was issued in 1864, and reprinted in 1883.

Longman  was chairman of the fund raised by "the trade" in London and the provinces for the relief of the booksellers of Paris during the siege by the Germans in 1870.  Of the general operations of the firm while he was its head one of the most notable was the publication of Lord Macaulay's works, especially the History of England, for his share of the profits of the third and fourth volumes of which the author received, and that merely as a payment on account, the famous cheque for £20,000, dated 13 March 1856.

In 1863 the firm purchased the business and stock of John W. Parker, the publisher of West Strand, London, with which it acquired many valuable or interesting copyrights, among them that of the works of John Stuart Mill and Fraser's Magazine. In 1870 Longman purchased the copyrights of Benjamin Disraeli's novels, including Lothair.

Longman died 30 August 1879, and left two sons, T. N. Longman who followed his father and became head of the firm, and G. H. Longman. He was the author of a pamphlet, published in 1872, Some Observations on Copyright and our Colonies, with special reference to Canada''.

Notes

References

Further reading

British publishers (people)
1804 births
1879 deaths
19th-century British businesspeople